The Monte Cassino Commemorative Cross is a commemorative medal awarded to all soldiers of the Polish II Corps who fought in the battle of Monte Cassino and the battles for Piedimonte and Passo Corno. After the capture of Monte Cassino in May 1944, the Polish government-in-exile (in London) created a campaign cross to commemorate the role of the Polish II Corps (often known as Anders Army) in capturing this strategic point, which had long blocked the Allied advance up the Italian peninsula.

A consignment of 50,000 crosses was ordered from a manufacturer in Tel Aviv, then part of British-ruled Palestine, where the Polish forces had spent part of 1942 and almost all of 1943 in training. A total of 48,498 crosses (serial numbers 1 to 48,498) were awarded with accompanying award documents issued in the field to each soldier who took part in the battle. Although it is commonly believed that no master record exists to indicate which serial numbers were given to specific soldiers, records do indicate which blocks of serial numbers were given to units within the Polish II Corps. Furthermore, the actual lists of named cross recipients are held at the Polish Institute and Sikorski Museum.

The 1502 un-awarded crosses (serial numbers 48,499 to 50,000) were eventually sold off to dealers and collectors. At the moment of its institution in June 1944, the medal was 19th in the Polish order of precedence.

Recipients by Unit
The Monte Cassino Commemorative Cross was issued to the following units:
CROSS No. UNIT

1 Senior Commanders - General Władysław Anders, General Officer Commanding 2 Polish Corps 
2 Senior Commanders - General Zygmunt Bohusz-Szyszko, Deputy General Officer Commanding 2 Polish Corps 
3 Senior Commanders - Bishop Józef Gawlina, Polish Army Field Bishop 
4 Senior Commanders - General Bolesław Bronisław Duch, General Officer Commanding 3 Carpathian Rifle Division 
5 Senior Commanders - General Nikodem Sulik, General Officer Commanding 5 Kresowa Infantry Division 
6 Senior Commanders - General Bronisław Rakowski, General Officer Commanding 2 Armoured Brigade 
7 Senior Commanders - General Roman Odzierzyński General Officer Commanding 2 Polish Corps Artillery
8 Senior Commanders - General Prof. Dr Bolesław Szarecki, General Officer Commanding 2 Polish Corps Medical Services 
9 Senior Commanders - Colonel Dr. Ludwik Ząbkowski, Commanding Officer 2 Artillery Group, 2 Polish Corps 
10 Senior Commanders - Colonel Kazimierz Wiśniowski, 2 Polish Corps Chief of Staff
11 Senior Commanders - Colonel Stanisław Skowroński, 2 Polish Corps Quartermaster
12 Senior Commanders - Colonel Mieczysław Zaleski, Commanding Officer 2 Polish Corps Signals Units 
13 Senior Commanders - Colonel Konstanty Skąpski, Commanding Officer 2 Polish Corps Engineering Units
14-749 Headquarters 2 Corps Staff 
750 Headquarters 2 Corps Staff – Melchior Wańkowicz, War Correspondent  
751-1102 Killed in Action 3 Carpathian Rifle Division 
1103-2043 Officers 3 Carpathian Rifle Division 
2044-14702 Other Ranks listed Alphabetically 3 Carpathian Rifle Division  
14703-14750 Not Awarded
14751-15246 5 Kresowa Infantry Division Headquarters Staff 
15247-15375 Headquarters Staff 5 Wilno Infantry Brigade  
15376-16136 13 Wilno Rifle Battalion 
16137-16878 14 Wilno Rifle Battalion 
16879-17615 15 Wilno Rifle Battalion 
17616-17743 Headquarters Staff 6 Lwow Infantry Brigade 
17744-18477 16 Lwow Rifle Battalion 
18478-19206 17 Lwow Rifle Battalion 
19207-19938 18 Lwow Rifle Battalion 
19939-20656 4 Light Artillery Regiment 
20657-21362 5 Light Artillery Regiment 
21363-22027 6 Light Artillery Regiment 
22028-22654 5 Anti-Tank Regiment  
22655-23554 5 Light Anti-Aircraft Regiment  
23555-24438 15 Poznan Lancer Regiment 
24439-25130 5 Heavy Machine Gun Battalion 
25131-26019 5 Engineers Battalion 5KDP 
26020-26526 5 Signals Battalion 
26527-26770 5 Sanitary (Medical) Company  
26771-27016 6 Sanitary (Medical) Company  
27017-27059 Command Supply and Transport Units 
27060-27324 5 Supply Company  
27325-27583 6 Supply Company  
27584-27966 15 Supply Company  
27967-28307 16 Supply Company  
28308-28443 5 Workshop Company [5 EME Coy.]  
28444-28586 6 Workshop Company [6 EME Coy.]  
28587-28691 5 Provost (Military Police) Squadron [Coy.]  
28692-28733 6 Light Artillery Regiment  
28734-28739 15 Poznan Lancer Regiment 
28751-28975 Headquarters 2nd Warsaw Armoured Brigade  
28976-28987 On secondment to 2nd Armoured Brigade  
28988 Headquarters 2nd Warsaw Armoured Brigade  
28989-29672 4 Skorpion Armoured Regiment 
29673-30328 1 Krechowiecki Lancer Regiment  
30329-30992 6th Children of Lwów Armoured Regiment  
30993-31188 9 Signals Company  
31189-31385 9 Light Sanitary (Medical) Company  
31386-31909 9 Supply Company  
31910-32105 9 Workshop Company [9 EME Coy.]  
32106-32246 9 Forward Tank Replacement Squadron [Coy.]  
32247-32269 6 Field Court, 2nd Armoured Brigade  
32270-32300 Not Awarded 
32301-32332 Command, 2nd Artillery Group  
32333-32361 Staff, Counter-Battery Section  
32362-33050 7 Horse Artillery Regiment  
33051-33055 7 Horse Artillery Regiment - Wounded  
33056-33057 7 Horse Artillery Regiment - Killed in Action 
33058-33759 9 Medium Artillery Regiment  
33760-33767 9 Medium Artillery Regiment - Killed in Action/Died of Wounds 
33768-34364 10 Medium Artillery Regiment  
33765-34367 10 Medium Artillery Regiment - Wounded  
33768-34374 10 Medium Artillery Regiment – Killed in Action  
34375-34936 11 Medium Artillery Regiment  
34937-34940 11 Medium Artillery Regiment - Wounded 27/4 to 11/5/45
34941-34945 11 Medium Artillery Regiment - Killed in Action/Died of Wounds
34946-34949 11 Medium Artillery Regiment 
34950-34951 Command, 2nd Artillery Group
34952-34960 Not Awarded
34961-34978 Command, 2 Corps Artillery  
34979-35631 7 Anti-Tank Regiment  
35632-35657 7 Anti-Tank Regiment - Killed  
35658-36543 7 Light Anti-Aircraft Regiment  
36544-37518 8 Heavy Anti-Aircraft Regiment  
37519-38083 1 Artillery Survey Regiment  
38084-38655 Carpathian Lancer Regiment 
38656 Colonel Henryk Ignacy Szymanski (USA) US Army Liaison
38657-38760 Carpathian Lancer Regiment 
38761-38776 Command, 2 Corps Engineers  
38777-39697 10 Battalion, Corps Engineers [10 Polish Corps Troops Engineers] 
39698-40043 10 Bridging Company 
40044-40297 301 Engineering Company 
40298-40370 304 Mechanical Equipment Platoon 
40371-40398 10 Bomb Disposal Platoon 
40399-40420 306 Engineering Park 
40421-40438 Command, Army Signals 2 Corps 
40439-41052 11 Signals Battalion 
41053-41061 2 Corps Signals Traffic Control Team 
41062-41111 Corps Artillery Fire Control Signals Platoon 
41112-41167 Command, Corps Artillery Group Signals Platoon  
41168-41234 11 Special Radiotelegraphic Platoon 
41235-41245 12 Special information Platoon 
41246-41280 386 Signals Platoon 
41281-41320 389 Medium Radio Platoon 
41321-41338 2 Corps Signals Park 
41339-41371 Seconded from 7 Inf.Div for Telephone Network Security  
41372-41440 Air Support Signals Section 
41441-41446 Aerial Photographic Interpretation Section  
41447-41449 Heads of 2 Corps Medical Services  
41450-41615 3 Casualty Clearing Station [stationed at Venafro] 
41616-41783 5 Casualty Clearing Station [stationed at Pozzilli] 
41784-42159 161 Military Hospital [later 2 Military Hospital - stationed at Campobasso]  
42160-42171 Aerial Photographic Interpretation Section  
42172-42328 162 Military Hospital [also known as 6 Field Hospital - stationed at Venafro]
42329-42736 1 Military Hospital [later 5 Military Hospital - stationed at Casamassima] 
42737-43169 3 Military Hospital [stationed at Palagiano]  
43170-43415 31 Sanitary (Medical) Company  
43416-43443 32 Field Hygiene Platoon  
43444-43451 34 Anti-Malaria Section  
43452-43460 45 Surgical Team  
43461-43470 46 Surgical Team 
43471-43480 47 Surgical Team  
43481-43489 48 Surgical Team  
43490-43493 49 Transfusion Team  
43494-43497 50 Transfusion Team 
43498-43514 341 Field Medical Dump 
43515-43520 Field Bacteriological-Chemical Unit 
43521-43541 Heads, Supply and Transport Services 
43542-43589 Command, 2 Corps Supply & Transport Units
43590-43863 21 Transport Company
43864 Brigadier Sir E H C Frith (UK) C.O. 26 British Liaison Unit  
43865-43970 21 Transport Company
43971-44403 22 Transport Company 
44404-44768 23 Transport Company 
44769-45159 24 Transport Company 
45160-45369 29 Ambulance Company 
45370-45419 30 Independent Workshop Platoon 
45420-45459 326 Supply Dump 
45460-45501 327 Supply Dump 
45502-45539 328 Supply Dump 
45540-45617 61 Anti-Aircraft Artillery Supply Unit 
45618-45715 62 Anti-Aircraft Artillery Supply Unit 
45716-45777 331 Mobile Field Bakery 
45778-45843 332 Mobile Field Bakery  
45844–45884 334 Propellant Fuel Dump 
45885-45912 336 Office Materials Dump 
45913-45923 Delegation of Head of Field Canteens 
45924-45973 318 Field Canteen and Mobile Library Company 
45974-45986 Command, 26 Field [Forward] Supply Centre 
45987-45999 Command, 27 Field [Forward] Supply Centre  
46000-46012 Command, 28 Field [Forward] Supply Centre  
46013-46026 Heads, Corps Material Services  
46027-46045 Heads of Non-divisional Material Service Units  
46046-46207 Command, Corps Material Park 
46208-46251 Material Parks Delivery Platoon 
46252-46257 Field Officers shop  
46258-46269 Field Ammunitions Laboratory 
46270-46377 350 Material Company Supply Station 
46378-46480 375 Field Laundry 
46481-46496 377 Field Bath  
46497-46515 378 Field Bath  
46516-46527 Heads of Corps Electrical and Mechanical Engineering Service  
46528-46693 13 Workshop Company [13 EME Coy.]  
46694-46872 15 Workshop Company [15 EME Coy.]  
46873-47123 35 Workshop Company [35 EME Coy.]  
47124-47127 Corps Ordinance Workshop  
47128-47294 36 Rescue Company 
47295-47303 Heads of Geographical Services  
47304-47455 12 Geographical Company  
47456-47475 312 Field Map Store 
47476-47484 Command 2 Corps Provost (Military Police) 
47485-47648 11 Provost (Military Police) Squadron [Coy.]  
47649-47659 1 Provost (Military Police) Platoon  
47660-47676 2 Provost (Military Police) Platoon 
47677-47756 Command, Army Service Corps Units 
47757-47958 Guard Battalion 
47959-47966 Heads, Justice Service 
47967-47994 12 Field Court 
47995-48006 Office of War Graves Registration 
48007-48046 370 Evacuated Equipment Park 
48047-48089 371 Evacuated Equipment Park 
48090-48135 372 Evacuated Equipment Park 
48136-48149 2 Corps Inspectorate for Control of Technical Equipment 
48150-48151 Heads, Field Postal Service 
48152-48171 2 Corps Field Postal Department 
48172-48178 2 Corps Military Censors Office 
48179-48216 2 Corps Meteorological Section 
48217-48230 Command, 2 Corps Financial Service [Paycorps]
48231-48257 2 Corps Press and Culture Office 
48258-48263 Press and Culture Office, non-divisional units 
48264-48272 Command Station No.1 
48273-48290 Smoke Screen Unit 
48291-48293 Soldiers’ Welfare Section 
48294-48355 Concert and Entertainment Section 
48356-48385 Reserve Liaison and Translator Officers 
48386-48399 111 Bridge Security Company 
48400-48407 Health Service Inspectorate, Women's Auxiliary Service (Poland)  
48408-48498 Independent Commando Company 
48499-48505 Headquarters 2 Corps Staff  
48506-48514 Cipher Office and Radio Station 
48515-48517 7 Light Anti-Aircraft Regiment  
48518 7 Anti-Tank Regiment  
48519 301 Engineering Company 
48520 389 Medium Radio Platoon 
48521-48523 2 Provost (Military Police) Platoon 
48524 Heads, Supply and Transport Services 
48525-48526 
48527-48529 24 Transport Company 
48530-48531 29 Ambulance Company 
48532-48535 318 Field Canteen and Mobile Library Company 
48536 35 Workshop Company [35 EME Coy.]  
48537 13 Workshop Company [13 EME Coy.]  
48538-48540 5 Military Hospital (Previously 1 Military Hospital) 
48541-48542 162 Military Hospital 
48543 161 Military Hospital 
48544-48547 111 Bridge Security Company 
48548-48553 Headquarters 2 Corps Staff  
48554-48580 Aerial Photographic Interpretation Section  
48581 8 Heavy Anti-Aircraft Regiment  
48582-48583 Smoke Screen Unit 
48584-48585 3 Casualty Clearing Station 
48586 31 Sanitary (Medical) Company  
48587-48597 Guard Battalion 
48598-48600 Headquarters 2 Corps Staff 
48601-48687 5 Kresowa Infantry Division (Various) Added after 22.2.1945  
48688-48691 Headquarters 2 Corps Staff 
48692 2 Corps Signals Traffic Control Team 
48693 Carpathian Lancer Regiment  
48694-48696 Heads of 2 Corps Medical Services  
48697-48710 Heads, Supply and Transport Services  
48711-48715 Heads of Corps Electrical and Mechanical Engineering Service  
48716-48720 Command, Army Service Corps Units 
48721-48749 
48750-48759 Headquarters 2 Corps Staff  
48760 7 Anti-Tank Regiment  
48761 1 Artillery Survey Regiment  
48762-48796 Convalescent Home (2 Battalion) 
48797 Heads, Supply and Transport Services  
48798 Heads, Corps Material Service 
48799-48821 Guard Battalion 
48822-48823 2 Corps Press and Culture Office 
48824-48830 
48831 663 Artillery Observation Air Squadron 
48832 
48833 7 Anti-Tank Regiment  
48834-48845 
48846 Convalescent Home (2 Battalion) 
48847 8 Heavy Anti-Aircraft Regiment 

The units listed above are not the official British War Office designations, but rather a close translated version taken from the Polish.

This information was brought to you courtesy of Andrzej Sankowski, and The Polish Institute and General Sikorski Museum. It was compiled by Dr. Mark Ostrowski. Recent research has established that the initial figures cited above were miscalculated and in fact the last known cross given to a named recipient was 48847. The complete list of named recipients is at the Polish Institute and Sikorski Museum in File AXII/85/214, Folders 1-19.

See also
Battle of Monte Cassino

References

External links
Krzyż Pamiątkowy Monte Cassino The only online database of Monte Cassino Cross recipients. It is still a wok in progress, but it has over 70% of the crosses listed against their recipients. In Polish.  
The Polish Victory at Monte Cassino

Dal Volturno a Cassino a website that has as its main purpose to collect and disseminate information on both, notably to the battle of Cassino is to all those events less known, but it must be related, temporally preceding and the following. 

Battle of Monte Cassino
Polish campaign medals